The Marshyangdi (or Marsyangdi) (Nepali: , marśyāṅdī) is a mountain river in Nepal. Its length is about 150 kilometres.

The Marshyangdi begins at the confluence of two mountain rivers, the Khangsar Khola and Jharsang Khola, northwest of the Annapurna massif at an altitude of 3600 meters near Manang village. The Marshyangdi flows eastward through Manang District and then southward through Lamjung District. Marshyangdi river has great potentiality for hydropower purpose and also for entertainment purpose such as rafting, kayaking.

The Marshyangdi joins the Trishuli near Mugling as one of its tributaries.

The beginning of the Annapurna Circuit trekking route follows the Marshyangdi river valley.

Tributaries 

1. Khangsar River
2. Jharsang River
3. Dordi River
4. Paudi River
5. Chepe River
6. Chundi River
7. Daraudi
8.Nangdi River
9. Khudi River
10. Dhud River
11. Nar River
The Marshyangdi joins the Trishuli near Mugling.

Infrastructures
Upper Marsyandgi A Hydroelectric Station (50 MW)
Middle Marsyangdi Hydropower Station (70 MW)
Marsyangdi Hydropower Station (69 MW)

References

Rivers of Gandaki Province